Security Forces Headquarters – Kilinochchi (SFHQ-KLN) was a regional command of the Sri Lanka Army, that was responsible for the operational deployment and command all army units stationed in Kilinochchi District, this includes several divisions and the independent brigades. This a new command established to maintain control over newly recaptured area. It was one of the five Security Forces Headquarters and the General Officer Commanding it is one of the most senior officers in the army, the post is designated as Commander Security Forces Headquarters  - Kilinochchi. The SFHQ-KLN was based at Kilinochchi. It was disbanded in October 2021, having been replaced with the newly formed I Corps.

Composition
57 Division, operating in the Kilinochchi District
65 Div, operating in the Kilinochchi District
66 Div, operating in the Kilinochchi District
Task Force 3, operating in the Kilinochchi District
Affiliated Units
FMA Units

References

Fromer commands of the Sri Lanka Army
Government of Kilinochchi District